Lourdes Domínguez Lino and Mariana Duque were the defending champions, but chose not to participate.

Belgian-duo Ysaline Bonaventure and Elise Mertens won the title, defeating Marina Melnikova and Mandy Minella in the final, 6–4, 3–6, [11–9].

Seeds

Draw

References 
 Draw

Internacional Femenil Monterrey - Doubles